A Russian swing is a large, floor-mounted swing which is sometimes used in circus performances to make impressive high acrobatic jumps.

Unlike ordinary playground swings, a Russian swing has steel bars instead of ropes, and its swinging platform is able to rotate 360 degrees around the horizontal bar from which it is suspended. Two or more acrobats stand on the swing platform, pumping it back and forth until it is swinging in high arcs. This motion increases the centrifugal force of the flyer (the acrobat who is going to jump). The flyer then lets go of the swing at the peak of its arc, gaining enough altitude to execute one of various aerial flips before landing at a distance from the swing. The flyer may land on a crash mat, in a vertically slanted net, in the arms of other acrobats (referred to as catchers), in a pool of water, or even on the platform of another Russian swing.

Performing companies whose shows have used the Russian swing include:
 Cirque du Soleil (Saltimbanco, O, Varekai, Love, Luzia)
 Flying Angels
 Ringling Bros. and Barnum & Bailey Circus (Zing Zang Zoom)
 Moscow State Circus
 Troupe Shatalov
 UniverSoul Circus (Zhukau acrobatic troupe)
 Vorobiev Troupe
Gamma Phi Circus at Illinois State University

Playgrounds 

In Russia and other countries, the Russian swing is sometimes seen on playgrounds. However, the more typical swings in Russia will feature a regular seat, hung on steel bars.

See also 
 Circus skills
 Russian bar
 Kiiking

Sources 

Circus equipment
Circus skills